Chobepur is a suburb in Kanpur, India, situated about 25 km from Kanpur on the Grand Trunk Road to Delhi.The population was 2000 at the 2001 census. It has 75% of literacy and is 5 km from Mandhana, a Kanpur suburb.

Transport

By road
aramau has a bus station and UPSRTC Busses of Kanpur have routes from Naramau to different localities.

By rail
Mandhana, nearest railway station on the Kanpur-Farrukhabad line.

By air
Kalyanpur Airstrip is nearest airport.

Tourist attractions
The pilgrimage spot of Bithoor is 10 km from the town.

References

Neighbourhoods in Kanpur